Hăghiac may refer to several villages in Romania:

 Hăghiac, a village in Dofteana Commune, Bacău County
 Hăghiac, a village in Răchitoasa Commune, Bacău County